Sofia Sergeyevna Prosvirnova (born 20 December 1997) is a Russian short track speed skater.

Career
She competed at the 2014 Winter Olympics in the individual 500 m and 1,000 m events and in the 3,000 meters relay and placed 15th, 24th and 4th, respectively.

World Cup results

Podiums

Overall rankings

References

External links

1997 births
Living people
Russian female short track speed skaters
Olympic short track speed skaters of Russia
Short track speed skaters at the 2014 Winter Olympics
Short track speed skaters at the 2018 Winter Olympics
Short track speed skaters at the 2022 Winter Olympics
Sportspeople from Saint Petersburg
World Short Track Speed Skating Championships medalists
Universiade gold medalists for Russia
Universiade medalists in short track speed skating
Competitors at the 2019 Winter Universiade
21st-century Russian women